Prostanthera sericea, commonly known as silky mintbush or walyuwalyu, is a species of flowering plant in the family Lamiaceae and is endemic to inland Australia. It is an erect shrub with hairy branches, cylindrical leaves and white flowers with mauve or purple streaks.

Description
Flowering occurs from July to December or March.

Taxonomy
Silky mintbush was first formally described in 1926 by John McConnell Black who gave it the name Prostanthera baxteri var. sericea in the Flora of South Australia from specimens collected near the Birksgate Range during the Elder expedition of 1891. In 1988, Barry Conn raised the variety to species status as Prostanthera sericea in the journal Nuytsia.

Distribution and habitat
Prostanthera sericea grows on stony hills, in rocky gorges and on sand dunes and sandplains in the east of Western Australia, southern Northern Territory and western South Australia.

References

sericea
Flora of New South Wales
Lamiales of Australia
Plants described in 1926
Taxa named by John McConnell Black